Louis Shapiro AKA Louis Bain (died 1921) was an American political activist who was a founding member of the Communist Party of America, the Executive Secretary of its Central Executive Committee, and a representative of the Jewish Federation.

Career
Shapiro was a member of the Socialist Party of America and active in the formation of its left wing. In 1919, he became a founding member of the Communist Party of America.  Sharpiro was an organizer of District No. 2 (New York) and then Secretary of an early Communist Party following the Party's second convention on July 13–18, 1920.

Death
In February 1921, Shapiro went on Party business to the Soviet Union.  In mid-July 1921, on the trip home, he died of heart disease in Hamburg, Germany.

References

Year of birth missing
1921 deaths
American Marxists
American communists
Members of the Communist Party USA
Communist Party USA politicians